Mohammed Mazyad (born 10 December 1991) is a Saudi Arabian professional footballer who plays as a goalkeeper for Al-Arabi.

Club career
Mohammed Mazyad started his career in the youth team of Al-Jabalain. He was promoted to the first team in 2012 and spent four seasons at the club. With Al-Jabalain, Mazyad won the 2014–15 Saudi Third Division title and achieved promotion to the Saudi Second Division. On 11 July 2016, Mazyad joined city rivals Al-Tai on a two-year deal. He made his debut on 6 January 2017 in the league match against Wej. He spent three seasons at the club and made 42 league appearances for the club. On 17 June 2019, Mazyad joined Al-Ain. In his first season at the club, Mazyad kept 17 clean sheets in 36 appearances, the most by any keeper in the league. Mazyad also helped Al-Ain get promoted to the Pro League for the first time in the club's history. On 27 January 2022, Mazyad joined Al-Sahel. On 6 June 2022, Mazyad joined newly promoted side Al-Arabi.

Career statistics

Club

Honours
Al-Jabalain
 Saudi Third Division: 2014–15

References

External links
 

Living people
1991 births
Saudi Arabian footballers
Association football goalkeepers
Al-Jabalain FC players
Al-Tai FC players
Al-Ain FC (Saudi Arabia) players
Al-Sahel SC (Saudi Arabia) players
Al-Arabi SC (Saudi Arabia) players
Saudi Fourth Division players
Saudi Second Division players
Saudi First Division League players
Saudi Professional League players